was a Japanese politician of the Democratic Party of Japan. He was Minister of Agriculture.

He lost his seat in the 16 December 2012 general election.

Kano was born in  Yamagata. He graduated from  Gakushuin University.

After period of illness, Michihiko Kano died on 21 October 2021 in a hospital in Yamagata City; he was 79.

References

1942 births
2021 deaths
Ministers of Agriculture, Forestry and Fisheries of Japan
Democratic Party of Japan politicians
Politicians from Yamagata Prefecture
Gakushuin University alumni
21st-century Japanese politicians
People from Yamagata (city)